Beverly Joan Mary Huke (born 19 May 1951) is an English professional golfer. She was a founding member of the Women's Professional Golfers' Association (WPGA) and won 7 tournaments on the Ladies European Tour (LET) between 1979 and 1986.

Career
Huke advanced to the final of the 1971 British Ladies Amateur where Mickey Walker won 3 and 1. She represented Great Britain & Ireland at the Vagliano Trophy in 1971 and 1975, and at the Curtis Cup in 1972. She won the English Women's Amateur Championship in 1975 at Royal Birkdale.

After turning professional, Huke won seven tournaments in eight seasons on the LET in Scotland, England, Spain, Germany and Northern Ireland. She was also runner-up by one stroke twice.

In 2017, ahead of the 40 year anniversary of the WPGA, Huke was made Honorary Member of the PGA in recognition of her role as a pioneer of women's professional golf.

Professional wins (7)

Ladies European Tour wins (7)

Source:

Team appearances
Amateur
Vagliano Trophy: (representing Great Britain & Ireland): 1971, 1975 
European Ladies' Team Championship (representring England): 1975, 1977
Curtis Cup (representing Great Britain & Ireland): 1972

References

External links
2009 LET Media Guide: Past Tournament Winners

English female golfers
Ladies European Tour golfers
Sportspeople from Dundee
1951 births
Living people